Federal Highway 5 (Fed. 5) is a tollfree part of the federal highways corridors, and 
follows the northeast length of the state of Baja California from the US-Mexico border in Mexicali at the northern point at San Felipe in the south. The highway is entirely inside the Mexicali Municipality. However, a state highway from San Felipe to Puertecitos (San Felipe Municipality) is usually considered part of Fed. 5. From San Felipe to the south, the road follows the seacoast of the Gulf of California.

As of February 2020, the entire length of Hwy 5 has now been paved to the junction with Hwy 1.

Route description
The road begins in the border city of Mexicali near the western border crossing. It has four lanes from there for about km 80.  At this point it becomes a two-lane highway (with little or no shoulder in most areas) until km 160, about 18 km (11 mi) south of the junction with Fed. 3, and about 40 km (24 mi) north of San Felipe. From there, the highway is a broad, divided, four-lane highway with a median and ample shoulders, until it ends in San Felipe.

The new highway improvement segments being constructed from San Felipe to the north and Mexicali to the south are on a raised base so that roadway dips caused by the natural undulation of the landscape, a form of drainage, are replaced by drainage culverts covered by the highway. Vehicles no longer have to ford storm water passing over the roadway.  The resulting highway is less susceptible to erosion.

The interchange with Fed. 3 eliminates there the need for cross traffic driving.

Earthquake damage and repairs
The epicentre (32°15'32"N, 115°17'13.2"W) of the magnitude 7.2 earthquake on April 4, 2010 (2010 Baja California earthquake) is about 3 km east of the highway. Repairs on the highway began nearly immediately.  From km 20 to km 38, SCT (Secretaría de Comunicaciones y Transportes) contractors re-levelled the road and filled cracks.

The hurricanes in Sept & October 2018 have caused significant damage to the bridges south of San Felipe.  Some bridges lost their entire roadway, while others have gaping holes at the abutments (ends) of the bridge.  All these missing sections are bypassed using gravel detours.  Some of these detours are short & easy, while others wind down canyons & cross the wash a hundred or more feet below the bridge.  All are passable (slowly) in a passenger car in good weather.  One crew was observed making the major repairs needed; one can assume it will be years before the repairs are complete.

State Highway Extension
The state route that starts in San Felipe and continues to Puertecitos is a natural extension of Fed. 5. It is an undivided, two-lane highway that has some rough spots and has many significant dips or fords where the highway meets normally-dry steams. One of the largest is labelled on the road in both directions as the "OH SHIT DIP." The continuation of Baja 5 to Gonzaga Bay was paved in 2015. As of December 2020, good pavement continues to the Fed. 1 at Chapala. It is passible by cars, motor homes and trucks.

Baja California 
 Mexicali intersection with Fed. 2
 El Chinero intersection with Fed. 3 north of San Felipe
 Puertecitos

References

005